The first Preston and Berlin Railway was a steam-operated railway, opened for operation in 1857.

Berlin's city council awarded the line a subsidy.

The line operated for just three months.  Ice flowing down the Grand River damaged piers of its bridge at Doon, Ontario.

The bridge never re-opened.

There were recriminations over the line's failure, and the satisfaction of those who inspected the line, and its bridge.  Eventually, in 1863, an act in Canada's Parliament exonerated Berlin City Council.  Edward Irving Ferguson acquired the line's assets, because he had held a mortgage on some of the line's property.  He sold those assets to the Grand Trunk Railway, on November 14, 1865.

The  from Berlin, to the Grand River, at Doon, was incorporated into a route the Grand Trunk built from Berlin to Galt, Ontario.

See also

 Preston and Berlin Street Railway
 Grand River Railway
 Great Western Railway (Ontario)
 List of Ontario railways

References

Rail transport in Cambridge, Ontario
Passenger rail transport in Cambridge, Ontario
Rail transport in Kitchener, Ontario
Passenger rail transport in Kitchener, Ontario
History of Cambridge, Ontario
History of Kitchener, Ontario
19th century in Kitchener
History of rail transport in the Regional Municipality of Waterloo
Defunct Ontario railways
Standard gauge railways in Canada